The Yorkshire (Woollen District) Electric Tramways  operated a tramway service in Dewsbury between 1903 and 1934.

History

Under the Spen Valley Light Railways Order of 1901 British Electric Traction set up the Yorkshire (Woollen District) Electric Tramways. 

The company established a tramway network centred on Dewsbury with branches to Cleckheaton, Birkenshaw, Ravensthorpe, Thornhill and Birstal.

Operations were replaced by the buses of British Electric Traction-owned Yorkshire Woollen District Transport Company.

Closure

Services ended on 31 October 1934.

References

Tram transport in England
Dewsbury
Transport in Kirklees